German submarine U-44 was a Type IXA U-boat of Nazi Germany's Kriegsmarine that operated during World War II. She was ordered in November 1936 and laid down in September 1938 in Bremen. She was launched in August 1939 and commissioned in November.

On 13 March 1940, she struck a mine that was located in field Number 7 off the north coast of the Netherlands. All 47 of her crew members went down with the submarine.

Construction

U-44 was ordered by the Kriegsmarine on 21 November 1936 (as part of Plan Z and in violation of the Treaty of Versailles). She was laid down on 15 September 1938 by AG Weser, in Bremen as yard number 949. U-44 was launched on 5 August 1939 and commissioned on 4 November of that same year under the command of Kapitänleutnant Ludwig Mathes.

Design
As one of the eight original German Type IX submarines, later designated IXA, U-44 had a displacement of  when at the surface and  while submerged. She had two shafts and two  propellers.

U-44 was fitted with six  torpedo tubes (four fitted at the bow and two at the stern), 22 torpedoes, one  SK C/32 naval gun, 180 rounds, and a  SK C/30 as well as a  C/30 anti-aircraft gun. The boat had a complement of forty-eight.

Service history

U-44 had a very short operational life. During her service with the Kriegsmarine, she took part in only two combat patrols. After training exercises with the 6th U-boat Flotilla from 4 November to 31 December 1939, U-44 was assigned as the front boat for the 2nd U-boat Flotilla on 1 January 1940. She was to remain a part of this flotilla until her loss.

First patrol
The first of U-44s two patrols began on 6 January 1940 when she left Wilhelmshaven for the North Sea, eventually circumnavigating the British Isles, travelling as far south as the Bay of Biscay and Portugal. It was in these two locations that U-44 sank her first (and last) merchant ships. Following these victories, she headed north again, travelling just north of the coast of Scotland and back into the North Sea. She then returned to Wilhelmshaven, arriving there on 9 February 1940.

Second patrol
Unlike her first outing, U-44s second patrol was a disaster, not even lasting through the first day. After spending more than a month in Wilhelmshaven, she began her second patrol on 13 March 1940. A few hours after leaving port, U-44 entered minefield Number 7, just off of the northern coast of the Netherlands. All forty-seven of her crew were lost.

Previously recorded fate

Summary of raiding history
All of these ships were sunk during her first patrol.

References

Bibliography

External links

1939 ships
German Type IX submarines
Ships built in Bremen (state)
U-boats commissioned in 1939
U-boats sunk by mines
U-boats sunk in 1940
World War II shipwrecks in the North Sea
World War II submarines of Germany
Ships lost with all hands
Maritime incidents in March 1940